Khajuraho Airport  is a domestic airport that serves Khajuraho, Madhya Pradesh, India. The airport covers an area of 590 acres.

History
The Khajuraho Airport opened in 1978, facilitating tourism to the nearby UNESCO world heritage site temple complex.

In August 2013, the central government announced that the Khajuraho Airport would receive a new terminal.

Infrastructure
The airport has one asphalt runway, 01/19, with dimensions . The airport has one terminal with 2 aerobridges.

Airlines and destinations

References

External links
 

Airports in Madhya Pradesh
Bundelkhand
Transport in Khajuraho
1978 establishments in Madhya Pradesh
Airports established in 1978
20th-century architecture in India